Dalip Singh may refer to:

 Dalip Singh (athlete), first Sikh to represent India in the Olympics
 Dalip Singh (gymnastics coach), from Haryana, India
 Duleep Singh, last Maharajah of Sikh Empire
 Dalip Singh Rana, real name of actor and wrestler The Great Khali
 Dalip Singh Saund, American politician
Daleep Singh, American economic and national security advisor